Chadd is a name. Notable people with the name include:

Surname:
 Billy Lee Chadd (born 1954), American serial killer
 Carl Chadd, British puppeteer
 John Chadd (born 1933), Australian cricketer
 Lance Chadd (aka Tjyllyungoo; born 1954), Noongar painter

Given name:
 Chadd Cassidy (born 1973), American ice hockey coach 
 Chadd Sayers (born 1987), Australian cricketer

See also
 Chad (disambiguation)
Chad (name)